Sir Mark John MacTaggart-Stewart, 1st Baronet (12 October 1834 – 26 September 1923), known as Mark John Stewart until 1880, was a Scottish Conservative Member of Parliament in the House of Commons of the United Kingdom. He represented Wigtown Burghs from 1874 to 1880 and again for a few months later in 1880 and also sat for Kirkcudbrightshire between 1885 and 1906 and briefly in 1910.

He married in 1866 Marianne Susanna Ommanney, daughter and heiress of John Orde Ommanney (d.1846), who was a son of Sir Francis Molyneux Ommanney. Her mother Susanna MacTaggart was a daughter of Sir John McTaggart, 1st Baronet, and through her they inherited an estate at Ardwell. In 1905 he assumed the additional surname of MacTaggart as he and his wife took possession of the Ardwell estate of her grandfather. He was an officer in the 1st Ayrshire and Galloway Artillery Volunteers and was appointed their Honorary Colonel on 22 December 1888.

On 7 October 1892, he was made a Baronet, of Southwick in the Stewartry of Kirkcudbright and Blairderry in the County of Wigtown. MacTaggart-Stewart died in September 1923, aged 88. He was succeeded in the Baronetcy by his only surviving son, Sir Edward Orde MacTaggart-Stewart, 2nd Baronet.

Sir Mark and Lady MacTaggart-Stewart had five daughters and one son:
Janet Gertrude McTaggart-Stewart (b.1871), married in 1899 Robert George Seton (b.1860), a descendant of the Barons Brownlow, and left children.
Sarah Blanche McTaggart-Stewart (b.1872).
Frances Emily McTaggart-Stewart (1873–1949), married in April 1903 Archibald Kennedy, Earl of Cassilis (1872–1943), who succeeded in 1938 as Marquess of Ailsa. They left no children.
Susanna Mary McTaggart-Stewart (1878–1961), married first in 1901 Archibald Patrick Thomas Borthwick, 20th Lord Borthwick (1867–1910), and secondly in 1916 Alfred FitzRoy, 8th Duke of Grafton, leaving daughters by both husbands.
Margaret Anna McTaggart-Stewart (1880–1962), married in 1906 (div. 1919) Sir David Charles Herbert Dalrymple, 2nd Baronet (1879–1932), and had children.
Edward Orde McTaggart-Stewart (1883–1948), who succeeded as 2nd and last Baronet, leaving two daughters by his wife married in 1917  Hon. Margaret Selina Flora Maud Clifton-Hastings-Campbell (1895–1975), daughter of the 3rd Baron Donington.

Notes

References
Kidd, Charles, Williamson, David (editors). Debrett's Peerage and Baronetage (1990 edition). New York: St Martin's Press, 1990,

External links 
 

1834 births
1923 deaths
Baronets in the Baronetage of the United Kingdom
Members of the Parliament of the United Kingdom for Scottish constituencies
Scottish Tory MPs (pre-1912)
UK MPs 1874–1880
UK MPs 1880–1885
UK MPs 1885–1886
UK MPs 1886–1892
UK MPs 1892–1895
UK MPs 1895–1900
UK MPs 1900–1906
UK MPs 1910
Politics of Dumfries and Galloway
19th-century Scottish people
Place of birth missing